Bohumín is a town in Karviná District in the Moravian-Silesian Region of the Czech Republic. It has about 20,000 inhabitants.

Administrative parts
Bohumín is made up of town parts and villages of Nový Bohumín, Pudlov, Skřečoň, Starý Bohumín, Šunychl, Vrbice and Záblatí.

Geography
It lies in the Ostrava Basin.

The confluence of the Oder and Olza rivers is situated north of the town. The Oder forms the western border of the municipal territory and the Olza forms the northern border with Poland.

The area is rich in water bodies. They are used for recreational purposes. There is also the Záblatský fish pond in the southern part of the territory.

History

The first written mention of Bohumín (as Bogun) is in a stylistic exercise of Queen Kunigunda of Halych from 1256–1262. It was described as a large village. It was located on a trade route from Prague to Kraków.

King Louis II granted the town and château of Bohumín to George, Margrave of Brandenburg-Ansbach in 1523. The town began to develop during rule by the House of Hohenzollern, although further development of Bogumin was halted by frequent epidemics of bubonic plague and floodings of the Olza. It was officially known in German as Oderberg, and by the end of the 16th century the majority of citizens followed Protestantism. The successor after the Hohenzollerns in 1620 was Lazar Henckel, whose family of bankers and entrepreneurs hailed from Habsburg-ruled Hungary. In 1624 only 138 permanent residents lived in the town.

After defeating Maria Theresa of Austria during the Silesian Wars, King Frederick II of Prussia annexed most of Silesia, although Oderberg remained in Austrian Silesia. The town successively became part of the Austrian Empire (1804) and Austria-Hungary (1867).

After the Revolutions of 1848 in the Austrian Empire a modern municipal division was introduced in the re-established Austrian Silesia. The town became a seat of a legal district at first in Friedek and since 1868 in the Freistadt political district.

At the end of the 19th century, a wire and rolling mill was built here by German industrialists from Berlin, Albert Hahn and Heinrich Eisner. In 1872 the important Kassa-Oderberg railway line was opened in Šunychl, which later outgrew Oderberg, and Pudlov; this increased the town's importance.

According to the censuses conducted in 1880–1910 the population of the town grew from 1,839 in 1880 to 5,810 in 1910. In 1880 and 1890 the majority were Polish-speakers (58.1% in 1880 and 64.8% in 1890), followed by German-speakers (34.8% in 1880 and 27.6% in 1890) and Czech-speakers (6.9% in 1880 and 7.6% in 1890). In 1900 and 1910 the majority were German-speakers (52.8% in 1900, 54.5% in 1910), followed by Polish-speakers (41.7% in 1900 and 38.2% in 1910) and Czech-speakers (5.3% in 1900 and 7.3% in 1910). In terms of religion, in 1910 the majority were Roman Catholics (91.7%), followed by Protestants (206 or 3.5%), Jews (129 or 2.2%) and others (141 or 2.6%).

After the division of Cieszyn Silesia in 1920, the town became part of Czechoslovakia. Following the Munich Agreement, Bohumín and the Zaolzie region were annexed by Poland in October 1938. The town was then annexed by Nazi Germany at the beginning of World War II. The Germans operated several forced labour camps in the town, including a Polenlager camp solely for Poles, a camp solely for Jews, and the E728 subcamp of the Stalag VIII-B/344 prisoner-of-war camp in Nový Bohumín. On 1 May 1945 Bohumín was taken by Soviet troops of the 1st Guards Army. After the war it was restored to Czechoslovakia and the remaining German population was expelled westward in accordance to the Potsdam Agreement.

Demographics
The majority of citizens are Czech; many citizens have Polish ancestry, although the Polish minority in Bohumín was only 1.6% as of census 2021. Before World War II, the town was inhabited by a large German community. Nowadays the town is known as having one of the largest communities of Romani people in the Czech Republic.

Transport

Bohumín is one of the most important railway junctions in the Czech Republic. Several major international lines pass through the town and Bohumín has the direct connection with many European capitals. Some of the lines were built by the Emperor Ferdinand Northern Railway company. The lines going through Bohumín includes: Bohumín–Olomouc–Prague, Bohumín–Brno, Bohumín–Žilina–Vrútky, Bohumín–Košice, Bohumín–Bratislava–Budapest, Bohumín–Vienna–Graz, Bohumín–Warsaw–Gdańsk–Gdynia, Bohumín–Kraków–Przemyśl, and Bohumín–Wrocław–Berlin. There is also an important depot of České dráhy in Bohumín.

LEO Express also operates a bus line to Polish cities Katowice and Kraków.

There are the Bohumín /  Chałupki railway border crossing and Bohumín / Nowe Chałupki road border crossing to Poland.

The D1 motorway passes through the town.

Sights

There are few historical buildings remaining in Old Bohumín. It was always small with mostly wooden houses, which burnt down in frequent fires, as did the old town hall with its high tower. An old church still remains however; it was rebuilt in 1850 from its Gothic style to its current form. Another landmark is a tomb of the Henckels, former owners of Bohumín.

The most important landmarks of New Bohumín are the Catholic Church of Sacred Heart from 1896, town hall from 1897–1898, complex of former German schools from 1894–1914, and the Lutheran church from 1901.

Twin towns – sister cities

Bohumín is twinned with:
 Gorzyce, Poland
 Prudnik, Poland

References

External links

Cities and towns in the Czech Republic
Populated places in Karviná District
Cieszyn Silesia